Provannidae is a family of deep water sea snails, marine gastropod mollusks in the superfmaily Abyssochrysoidea (according to the taxonomy of the Gastropoda by Bouchet & Rocroi, 2005 and updated in 2008 by Kaim et al.). 

The genera Provanna and  Desbruyeresia have smaller and slender shells, while the shells of Alviniconcha and Ifremeria are larger and swollen. The shells of these two last genera house a hypertrophied ctenidium large quantities of symbiotic bacteria.

Habitat 
These snails are part of the fauna of the deep-sea hydrothermal vents, cold seeps, whale falls, and sunken driftwood environments.

Taxonomy 
The family Provaniidae was previously placed in the "Zygopleuroid group" (according to the taxonomy of the Gastropoda by Bouchet & Rocroi, 2005). This family has no subfamilies according to the taxonomy of the Gastropoda by Bouchet & Rocroi, 2005.

Subsequently, Provaniidae was placed in the superfamily Abyssochrysoidea Tomlin, 1927.

There are some affinities with the Littorinoidea as shown by molecular data  and  sperm ultrastructure 

Multi-gene analysis has shown that the family Provannidae is paraphyletic. It is being treated as belonging to the superfamily Abyssochrysoidea until a new family-level revision has been undertaken.

Genera 
Genera within the family Provannidae include:
 Alviniconcha Okutani & Ohta, 1988
 Cordesia Warén & Bouchet, 2009 - with the only species Cordesia provannoides Warén & Bouchet, 2009
 Desbruyeresia Warén & Bouchet, 1993
 Ifremeria Bouchet & Warén, 1991
 Ifremeria nautilei - this species has endosymbiotic bacteria, which provide "food" via chemoautotrophy.
 Provanna Dall, 1918
 Rubyspira Johnson et al., 2010 (not assigned to a family) 
Genera brought into synonymy
 Olgaconcha L. Beck, 1991: synonym of Ifremeria Bouchet & Warén, 1991

References 

 Warén,  A., and W.F. Ponder. 1991,  New species, anatomy, and systematic position of the hydrothermal vent and hydrocarbon seep gastropod family Provannidae  fam. n. (Caenogastropoda). Zool  Scr. 20: 27-56.

 
Caenogastropoda